Is There Anybody There? is a 1976 Australian TV movie directed by Peter Maxwell and produced by Robert Bruning. It has been called the first colour tele movie made in Australia and its success led to Bruning being commissioned to make a series of TV movies, including The Newman Shame which also starred Lazenby.

Synopsis
A fragile woman, Kate, is released from a sanatorium run by a man called Redwood into the arms of her husband John. While she was away John has begun an affair with Kate's sister Marianne.

The two sisters live together in an apartment block while John is away, and find themselves stalked by some mysterious strangers, Rosa and Duncan.

Marianne believes that she is being confused with Kate - but it turns out the whole thing is a plot by Kate to revenge herself on Marianne and John.

Marianne accidentally shoots John to death and then Kate shoots Marianne and escapes with John's money and her lover, Duncan - who has murdered Rosa.

Cast
George Lazenby as John
Wendy Hughes as Marianne
Tina Grenville as Kate
Charles Tingwell as Redwood
Patrick Ward as Duncan
Chantal Contouri as Rosa
Gordon McDougall
Stuart Wagstaff
Robert Bruning

Production
Robert Bruning had previously made a TV movie for Channel 9 called Paradise (1975) which he later called "terrible". That was a pilot for a series that never eventuated; Bruning calls this film "the first of the true-all film tele features". It was the first of an initial order of four films for Channel Seven made through Bruning's Gemini Productions.

"There is no way it will develop into a series," said Bruning of the movie. "It was written and produced as a complete feature."

The film was shot in Sydney.

Reception

Critical
A writer from the Sydney Morning Herald praised the "superb cast" and said the story had them "on the edge of my seat, horrifically hypnotised."

Ratings
The film rated very well on Channel 7 and was picked up by Paramount to distribute internationally.

The success of the film enabled Bruning to make a series of TV movies for Australian TV. In particular, Channel 7 bought three more movies off Bruning, Mama's Gone A-Hunting (1977), The Alternative (1977) and Gone to Ground (1977).

Bruning later sold Gemini to Grundy Productions and the film would be the first in a series of eleven telemovies from Grundys that were syndicated.

Awards
Bob Young's score won a Sammy Award for Best Theme music in 1976.

References

External links

Is There Anybody There? at AustLit (subscription required)
Is There Anybody There? at National Film and Sound Archive
Is There Anybody There? at Letterbox DVD

Australian television films
Films directed by Peter Maxwell